The Argus was a German automobile manufactured by Internationale Automobilzentrale KG Jeannin & Co from 1902 to 1904, then Argus Motoren-Gesellschaft Jeannin & Co from 1904 to 1906, and then Argus Motoren-Gesellschaft m.b.H. from November 1906 to 1945. 

The company was founded by Henri Jeannin in Berlin, and originally built copies of  Panhard & Levassor cars; they also featured P&L engines, and most of the other components of the vehicles came from France. In 1903 the company began producing engines of its own design; Argus cars now had 2,380 cc two-cylinder engines, and 4,960 cc and 9,240 cc four-cylinder engines. The cars were luxurious, and quite expensive as well.

The company went on to produce marine and aero engines. In 1929 they briefly returned to car engines making some for Horch.

Brass Era vehicles
Defunct motor vehicle manufacturers of Germany